Zentai is a term for skin-tight garments that cover the entire body.

Zentai may also refer to:
 A former administrative division in the Kingdom of Hungary, usually Zenta; Senta is now in Serbia
 Battle of Zenta

Surname
Hungarian ancestry
 Charles Zentai (1921–2017), suspected war criminal
 Ferenc Zentai, tennis player
 Lajos Zentai, football player
 László Zentai, author
 Máté Zentai, MMA fighter

Other
 Huang Zen-Tai, president, Soochow University